Beamish may refer to:

People
Alfred Beamish (1879–1944), English tennis player
Group Captain Charles Beamish (1908–1984), Irish rugby player and RAF pilot
Sir David Beamish, KCB (born 1952) British public servant
Emma Beamish (born 1982), Irish cricketer
Francis Beamish (1802-1868), Irish Whig and Liberal politician
Geordie Beamish (born 1996), New Zealand athlete
Sir George Beamish (1905–1967), British air marshal and Irish rugby player
Geraldine Beamish (1883–1972), English tennis player
Harold Beamish (1896–1986), New Zealand flying ace of World War I
Henry Hamilton Beamish (1873–1948), British racist and Rhodesian politician
Olive Beamish (1890–1978), Irish-born suffragette
Richard J. Beamish (1869–1945), Pennsylvania lawyer, journalist, author, and public official
Robert Beamish (1916–2001), Canadian physician and cardiologist
Sally Beamish (born 1956), British composer
Tufton Beamish (Royal Navy officer) (1874–1951), rear admiral in the Royal Navy and member of Parliament for Lewes
Tufton Beamish, Baron Chelwood of Lewes (1917–1989) son of the above; British Army officer and member of Parliament for Lewes
Group Captain Francis Victor Beamish, DSO & Bar, DFC, AFC (1903–1942), RAF fighter pilot 
Beamish Murdoch (1800–1876), Canadian lawyer, historian and political figure in Nova Scotia

Fictional characters
Chet Beamish, a character from the television series The Big Valley
Dr. Beamish, a character from the film Dracula's Daughter
Leonard Beamish, a character from the film Carry On Regardless
Bert Beamish, Mrs. Beamish and Major Beamish, characters in The Ickabog by J. K. Rowling
 Wendy Beamish, a character from the film St. Elmo's Fire

Places
Beamish, County Durham, a village in England
Beamish Museum, an open-air museum
Beamish Hall, a mid-18th-century country house near the town of Stanley, County Durham

Other uses
Beamish, a nonsense word from the 1872 poem "Jabberwocky" by Lewis Carroll
Beamish Stout, an Irish stout formerly brewed by Beamish and Crawford

See also
The Adventures of Willy Beamish, a 1991 computer game